Sunset Boulevard is a boulevard in the central and western part of Los Angeles, California, that stretches from the Pacific Coast Highway in Pacific Palisades east to Figueroa Street in Downtown Los Angeles. It is a major thoroughfare in the cities of Beverly Hills and West Hollywood (including a portion known as the Sunset Strip), as well as several districts in Los Angeles.

Geography 
Approximately  in length, the boulevard roughly traces the arc of mountains that form part of the northern boundary of the Los Angeles Basin, following the path of a 1780s cattle trail from the Pueblo de Los Angeles to the ocean.

From Downtown Los Angeles, the boulevard heads northwest, to Hollywood, through which it travels due west for several miles before it bends southwest towards the ocean. It passes through or near Echo Park, Silver Lake, Los Feliz, Hollywood, West Hollywood, Beverly Hills, and Holmby Hills. In Bel-Air, Sunset Boulevard runs along the northern boundary of UCLA's Westwood campus. The boulevard continues through Brentwood to Pacific Palisades, where it terminates at the Pacific Coast Highway intersection.

The boulevard has curvaceous winding stretches, and can be treacherous for unalert drivers in some sections. Sunset Boulevard is at least four lanes wide along its entire route. Sunset is frequently congested with traffic loads beyond its design capacity.

Sunset Boulevard historically extended farther east than it does now, starting at Alameda Street near Union Station and beside Olvera Street in the historic section of Downtown. The portion of Sunset Boulevard east of Figueroa Street was renamed Cesar Chavez Avenue in 1994, along with Macy Street and Brooklyn Avenue, in honor of the late Mexican-American union leader and civil rights activist.

History

In 1890, Belgian diplomat Victor Ponet bought  of the former Rancho La Brea land grant. His son-in-law, Francis S. Montgomery, inherited this property and created Sunset Plaza.

According to a 1901 article in the Los Angeles Herald, Sunset only extended from Hollywood in the west to Marion Avenue in the Echo Park district in the east. The Board of Public Works proposed to extend Sunset east to Main Street in the Plaza by routing the road over the existing section of Bellevue Avenue, but the plan was delayed until approximately 1904, due to active opposition by affected land owners. According to the 1910 Baist Real Estate Survey Atlas, Sunset Boulevard reached the Plaza by that time, but it did so by two short and narrow segments which were not aligned with each other and thus did not provide a proper thoroughfare to it. In late 1912, several properties along the route were condemned so that the boulevard could be changed in both its width and its alignment. With these changes completed, Sunset Boulevard now reached North Main Street and continued as Marchessault along the northern end of the Plaza. This section, variously marked and signed as Marchessault Street or East Sunset Boulevard, remained open to traffic until the late 1960s or early 1970s. At that time, Sunset was realigned one block north and Marchessault was closed to motor traffic.

In 1921 a westward expansion of Sunset began, extending the road from the then-current terminus at Sullivan Canyon toward the coast. This land, a portion of the original 1838 holdings of Francisco Marquez, stretched across a mesa and became known as the "Riviera section". Will Rogers, who had bought much of this land as an investment, later donated it to the State of California creating Will Rogers State Historic Park.  Circa 1931, Sunset was a paved road from Horn Avenue to Havenhurst Avenue.

Cultural aspects 
The Sunset Strip portion of Sunset Boulevard in West Hollywood has been famous for its active nightlife since at least the 1950s.

In contrast to other American cities where it referred to a concentration of radio retailers, in Los Angeles, Radio Row was understood in the 1940s–1950s as the area around the intersection of Sunset Boulevard and Vine Street in Hollywood, where the broadcasting facilities of all four major radio networks were located.

In the 1970s, the area between Gardner Street and Western Avenue was a center for street prostitution. Shortly after a much publicized incident in late June 1995, police raids drove out the majority of prostitutes on the Boulevard.

Part of Sunset Boulevard in Hollywood is also sometimes called "Guitar Row" due to the large number of guitar stores and music industry-related businesses, including the recording studios Sunset Sound Studios and United Western Recorders.

The portion of Sunset Boulevard that passes through Beverly Hills was once named Beverly Boulevard.

The boulevard is commemorated in Billy Wilder's film Sunset Boulevard (1950), the Andrew Lloyd Webber musical of the same name, and the 1950s television series 77 Sunset Strip. Jan and Dean's 1960s hit song "Dead Man's Curve" refers to a section of the road near Bel Air estates just north of UCLA's Drake Stadium where Jan Berry almost died in an automobile accident in 1966. The Buffalo Springfield song "For What It's Worth" was written about a riot at Pandora's Box, a Sunset Strip club, in 1966.

Metro Local lines 2, 4 and 602 operate on Sunset Boulevard, with Line 2 running through most of Sunset Boulevard between Echo Park and UCLA, Line 4 between Sunset Junction and Downtown LA, and Line 602 from UCLA west. The Metro B Line operates a subway station at Vermont Avenue.

At 4334 W. Sunset Boulevard lies the wall featured on the cover of the late singer-songwriter Elliott Smith's 2000 album Figure 8. Since Smith's death in 2003, the wall has become a memorial for the artist; fans have left many personal messages there over the years.

Landmarks (past and present)

Amoeba Records
Beverly Hills Hotel
Blessed Sacrament Church
Book Soup
Carney's
CBS Columbia Square
Chateau Marmont
Cinerama Dome
CNN
Comedy Store
Crossroads of the World
Directors Guild of America headquarters
Dudley Do-Right Emporium
Earl Carroll Theatre
Emerson College
The Garden of Allah
Gazzarri's
Gower Gulch
Haldeman House
Hollywood Athletic Club
Hollywood High School
Hollywood Palladium
Hotel Bel-Air
House of Blues
Hyatt West Hollywood
KCET
KTLA
The London Fog
Los Angeles Film School
Marymount High School
Metromedia Square (the former Fox Television Center and KTTV studios)
Nickelodeon on Sunset
Palisades Charter High School
Psychiatry: An Industry of Death Museum
Rainbow Bar and Grill
Rock Walk
The Roxy Theatre
Self-Realization Fellowship Lake Shrine
Sherry’s Club (now 1 OAK nightclub)
Spago
Standard Hotel
Sunset Junction
Sunset Gower Studios
Tiffany Theatre
Tiki Ti
United Western Recorders
UCLA
Viper Room
Whisky a Go Go
Will Rogers State Beach
Will Rogers State Historic Park

See also 

 Sunset Boulevard (film) (1950)

Notes

References

External links

 

 
Streets in Los Angeles
Streets in Los Angeles County, California
Landmarks in Los Angeles
Streets in Beverly Hills, California
Brentwood, Los Angeles
Pacific Palisades, Los Angeles
East Hollywood, Los Angeles
Echo Park, Los Angeles
Streets in Hollywood, Los Angeles
Silver Lake, Los Angeles
Streets in West Hollywood, California
Westside (Los Angeles County)
Film production districts
Historical red-light districts in the United States
Red-light districts in California
Boulevards in the United States